Sydney Albert Dawson Storey (27 February 1896 – 11 September 1966) was an Australian politician and a member of the New South Wales Legislative Assembly between 1941 and 1962.  In parliament he variously represented the United Australia Party, the Liberal Party and served two terms as a  conservative independent.

Storey was born in Balmain, New South Wales and was educated at Cleveland Street High School and the University of Sydney. He was initially employed as a clerk but trained as a draftsman and eventually became a hospital administrator. He was an executive of the New South Wales Hospital association and the Hospital Contributions Fund, a co-operative health insurance provider. Between 1930 and his death, Storey was elected as a Councillor on Hornsby Shire. He was the Shire President in 1933–34 and 1947–50.

After two unsuccessful campaigns, Storey entered the New South Wales parliament at the 1941 election as the Independent member for Hornsby. The sitting United Australia Party (UAP) member James Shand had decided to contest the neighbouring seat of Ryde and Storey defeated the endorsed UAP candidate Wilfred Francis. He retained the seat at the next 6 elections and became a member of the Liberal Party shortly after it was formed in 1945. Storey lost party pre-selection before the 1962 election and unsuccessfully contested it as an independent. He did not hold party, parliamentary or ministerial office.

His father was the NSW Labor Politician Thomas Storey, and his uncle NSW Labor Premier John Storey.

References

 

Members of the New South Wales Legislative Assembly
Liberal Party of Australia members of the Parliament of New South Wales
1896 births
1966 deaths
20th-century Australian politicians
Shire Presidents and Mayors of Hornsby